Lorella is a given name and may refer to:

Lorella Bellato, Italian paracanoer
Lorella Cedroni (1961–2013), Italian political philosopher
Lorella Cuccarini (born 1965), Italian dancer, singer, television host and actress
Lorella Jones (1943–1995), American particle physicist
Lorella De Luca (1940–2014), Italian film, television, and voice actress

Lorella may also refer to the unincorporated community Lorella, Oregon.